R-22 regional road is a Montenegrin roadway.

This road serves as an extension for  highway from Ulcinj to the most southern part of Montenegro, Ada Bojana.

History

In January 2016, the Ministry of Transport and Maritime Affairs published bylaw on categorisation of state roads. With new categorisation, R-17 regional road was renamed as R-22 regional road.

Major intersections

References

R-22